The 2014–15 Serbian SuperLiga is the 9th season of the SuperLiga, Serbian premier Handball league.

Team information 

The following 12 clubs compete in the SuperLiga during the 2014–15 season:

Personnel and kits
Following is the list of clubs competing in 2014–15 SuperLiga, with their president, head coach, kit manufacturer and shirt sponsor.

Regular season

Standings

Pld - Played; W - Won; D - Drawn; L - Lost; GF - Goals for; GA - Goals against; Diff - Difference; Pts - Points.

Schedule and results
In the table below the home teams are listed on the left and the away teams along the top.

Championship round

Standings

Pld - Played; W - Won; D - Drawn; L - Lost; GF - Goals for; GA - Goals against; Diff - Difference; Pts - Points.

Schedule and results
In the table below the home teams are listed on the left and the away teams along the top.

Relegation round

Standings

Pld - Played; W - Won; D - Drawn; L - Lost; GF - Goals for; GA - Goals against; Diff - Difference; Pts - Points.

Schedule and results
In the table below the home teams are listed on the left and the away teams along the top.

References

External links
 Official website
 Serbian Handball Federaration 

2014–15 domestic handball leagues
Serbian SuperLiga
Serbian SuperLiga